Season High is the fifth studio album by Swedish electronic music band Little Dragon, released on 14 April 2017 by Because Music. The song "High" was released as the first single.

Singles
"High" was released on 14 February 2017 as the album's lead single. The accompanying music video debuted on YouTube a day prior the single release.

A music video for the song "Sweet" was released on 8 March 2017.

A version of "High", remixed by Michael Uzowuru and Jeff Kleinman and featuring Denzel Curry and Twelve'len, was released on 4 April 2017.

Track listing

Personnel
Little Dragon
 Yukimi Nagano – vocals, production, cover image
 Fredrik Wallin – bass, keyboards, production, cover image
 Håkan Wirenstrand – keyboards, production, cover image
 Erik Bodin – drums, keyboards, production, cover image

Additional personnel
 James Ford – additional production, mixing
 Joe LaPorta – mastering
 Ibrahim Kamara – artwork
 Matt de Jong – design, layout

Charts

References

2017 albums
Because Music albums
Little Dragon albums
Experimental pop albums